The 1884 United States presidential election in North Carolina took place on November 6, 1888, as part of the 1888 United States presidential election. North Carolina voters chose 11 representatives, or electors, to the Electoral College, who voted for president and vice president.

North Carolina was won by Grover Cleveland, the 28th governor of New York, (D–New York), running with the former governor of Indiana Thomas A. Hendricks, with 53.25 percent of the popular vote, against Secretary of State James G. Blaine (R-Maine), running with Senator John A. Logan, with 46.59 percent of the popular vote.

Results

Results by county

References 

North Carolina
1884
1884 North Carolina elections